Lyubov Dombitskaya (born 17 May 1987) is a road cyclist from Kazakhstan. She represented her nation at the 2007 UCI Road World Championships.

References

External links
 profile at Procyclingstats.com

1987 births
Kazakhstani female cyclists
Living people
Place of birth missing (living people)
Cyclists at the 2006 Asian Games
Asian Games competitors for Kazakhstan
21st-century Kazakhstani women